In Her Shoes is a 2005 American comedy-drama film based on the novel of the same name by Jennifer Weiner. It is directed by Curtis Hanson with an adapted screenplay by Susannah Grant and stars Cameron Diaz, Toni Collette, and Shirley MacLaine. The film focuses on the relationship between two sisters and their grandmother.

Plot
Maggie and Rose Feller are very different sisters, raised by their father, Michael and their step-mother Sydelle, after their mother, Caroline died in a car accident. Rose is the elder; an ostensibly plain and serious lawyer who is protective of Maggie despite her flaws. Maggie is a free spirit who is unable to hold a steady job (partly due to her dyslexia) and turns to alcohol and men for emotional and financial support. After Sydelle throws Maggie out, Rose grudgingly allows Maggie to move in with her in her Rittenhouse Square apartment in Philadelphia. Maggie struggles to find a job and soon causes problems for Rose, including getting her car towed. Their already difficult relationship turns worse when Rose catches Maggie in bed with Jim, a man Rose has been dating. A heartbroken and furious Rose throws Maggie out.

A few days before, while secretly looking through her father's desk for money, Maggie had discovered a bundle of old greeting cards for her and Rose, containing cash, from their "estranged" grandmother Ella. Homeless and without job prospects, Maggie travels to Florida to find Ella. Believing Maggie is on vacation, Ella invites her to stay in her home. Ella admits to her close friend Ethel how Caroline had bipolar, and sent Ella a note several days before her death to look after her girls. As time passes, Ella deduces that Maggie has visited to do nothing but sunbathe and try to get money from her. Maggie asks Ella to finance an acting career, but Ella instead proposes to match her salary dollar for dollar if she accepts a job with the assisted living section of her grandmother's retirement community.

Meanwhile, Rose quits her job and decides to take some time off, becoming a dog-walker. She begins dating Simon Stein, a coworker whom she had previously ignored. They fall in love and get engaged. Maggie is befriended by one of her patients, a blind retired professor of English literature, who has asked Maggie to read works of poetry to him. Because of her dyslexia, she struggles at first, but the professor offers guidance and emotional support and over time she improves.

Maggie also becomes friendly with other residents of the retirement community, and discovers some residents need a personal clothing shopper, an activity for which Maggie shows enormous talent. Ella offers to run the financial aspects of the business, which quickly takes off, and in the process she and Maggie become close and resolve their history.

Meanwhile, Rose's reluctance to talk about Maggie is straining her relationships with Simon and her father. While Michael remains oblivious to his daughters' falling out, Simon tries to get Rose to talk about Maggie. When he sees Rose opening up to Jim about her issues instead, Simon breaks off the engagement. Ella contacts Rose and sends her a plane ticket, asking her to come for a visit. Rose confronts her father about hiding their grandmother from her and Maggie, and he reluctantly explains Ella had not approved of Caroline having children because of her mental illness and tendency to neglect her medication, and had blamed him for her death.

Rose is excited to meet her long-lost grandmother, but her pleasure quickly sours when she arrives and discovers Maggie already lives there. While reminiscing with Ella and Rose, Maggie tells a story of their mother taking them on a spontaneous trip to New York. Rose and Ella recognize the details of the story demonstrate Caroline was unwell, while Maggie is oblivious. Rose reveals after the trip Michael and Caroline had a huge argument, with Michael threatening to put her in a mental institution and Caroline killed herself two days later. Maggie realizes Rose had shielded her from the truth about their mother, and they reconcile.

Simon arrives in Florida, summoned by Maggie, and he and Rose reconcile. At last, Rose opens up to him about Maggie and her desire to protect her, fearing Simon will come to hate Maggie. Later, Rose's wedding takes place at the Jamaican Jerk Hut in Philadelphia where she and Simon had their first date. Ella and Michael reconcile, and Maggie reads a poem to Rose as a wedding gift, which moves Rose to tears.

Cast

Reception

Critical reception
In Her Shoes has received generally positive reviews from critics. Rotten Tomatoes reported that 75% of critics gave the film positive reviews, based on 164 reviews, with an average rating of 6.80/10. The site's critical consensus reads: "Honesty and solid performances make In Her Shoes a solid fit for all audiences". Metacritic reports an average review score of 60%, based on 36 reviews.

Rex Reed in The New York Observer calls In Her Shoes "pure joy" and "a movie to cherish", arguing that Shirley MacLaine has "found her finest role since the Oscar-winning Terms of Endearment [...] funny and poignant, she uses abundant humanity and smart psychology to great advantage, lending her knowledge to the other actors generously." Roger Ebert of the Chicago Sun-Times states that the film "starts out with the materials of an ordinary movie and becomes a rather special one. The emotional payoff at the end is earned, not because we see it coming as the inevitable outcome of the plot, but because it arrives out of the blue and yet, once we think about it, makes perfect sense. It tells us something fundamental and important about a character, it allows her to share that something with those she loves, and it does it in a way we could not possibly anticipate. Like a good poem, it blindsides us with the turn it takes right at the end."

Mick LaSalle of the San Francisco Chronicle argues, on the other hand, that the film  "is almost a true statement, almost an honest rendering of a sibling relationship and almost not a sentimental Hallmark card of a movie. But it compromises with itself and ends up in a limbo of meaninglessness, with writer Susannah Grant and director Curtis Hanson strenuously pretending to have told one kind of story, when actually they've told quite another." Carino Chocano of the Los Angeles Times concurred, calling the film "a curious movie, hovering for upward of two hours between light and dark, truth and fake uplift, menace and mollycoddling."

Box office
The film opened at #3 at the U.S. box office, raking in $10,017,575 USD in its first opening weekend. Its worldwide gross totaled $83,697,473.

Nominations
Shirley MacLaine
 Golden Globe Award for Best Supporting Actress - Motion Picture
 Satellite Award for Best Supporting Actress - Motion Picture

Toni Collette
 Satellite Award for Best Actress - Motion Picture Drama
 Australian Film Institute Award for Best Actress

Cameron Diaz
 Imagen Foundation Award for Best Actress

See also
List of artistic depictions of dyslexia

Notes

References

External links

 
 
 

2005 films
2005 romantic comedy-drama films
20th Century Fox films
American romantic comedy-drama films
Dyslexia in fiction
2000s English-language films
Films about families
Films about sisters
Films about dysfunctional families
Films based on American novels
Films directed by Curtis Hanson
Films scored by Mark Isham
Films set in Florida
Films set in Philadelphia
Films shot in Philadelphia
Films with screenplays by Susannah Grant
Scott Free Productions films
American female buddy films
2000s American films